The 13th Parliament of Upper Canada was opened 8 November 1836.  Elections in Upper Canada had been held 20 June 1836. All sessions were held at Toronto.

The House of Assembly had five sessions 8 November 1836 to 10 February 1840.

Both the House and Parliament sat at the third Parliament Buildings of Upper Canada.

In the election campaign of June 1836, the Lieutenant Governor Sir Francis Bond Head appealed to the United Empire Loyalists of the colony, proclaiming that the reformers were advocating American republicanism. The Conservative party, led by the wealthy landowners known as the "Family Compact", won the election resulting in a conservative majority in the legislative assembly and triggering dissent in the province. This was the last parliament for Upper Canada. This parliament was dissolved 10 February 1840.  The Act of Union 1840 abolished the legislative assemblies for Upper and Lower Canada and created a new Province of Canada with a common Legislative Assembly. This came as a result of the Rebellions of 1837.

See also
Legislative Council of Upper Canada
Executive Council of Upper Canada
Legislative Assembly of Upper Canada
Lieutenant Governors of Upper Canada, 1791-1841
Historical federal electoral districts of Canada
List of Ontario provincial electoral districts

References

References 
Handbook of Upper Canadian Chronology, Frederick H. Armstrong, Toronto : Dundurn Press, 1985. 
Journal of the House of Assembly of Upper Canada, from the eighth day of November, 1836, to the fourth day of March, 1837 (1837)

Parliaments of Upper Canada
1836 establishments in Upper Canada
1840 disestablishments in Upper Canada